In category theory, a branch of mathematics, a dual object is an analogue of a dual vector space from linear algebra for objects in arbitrary monoidal categories. It is only a partial generalization, based upon the categorical properties of duality for finite-dimensional vector spaces. An object admitting a dual is called a dualizable object. In this formalism, infinite-dimensional vector spaces are not dualizable, since the dual vector space V∗ doesn't satisfy the axioms. Often, an object is dualizable only when it satisfies some finiteness or compactness property.

A category in which each object has a dual is called autonomous or rigid. The category of finite-dimensional vector spaces with the standard tensor product is rigid, while the category of all vector spaces is not.

Motivation
Let V be a finite-dimensional vector space over some field K. The standard notion of a dual vector space V∗ has the following property: for any K-vector spaces U and W there is an adjunction HomK(U ⊗ V,W) = HomK(U, V∗ ⊗ W), and this characterizes V∗ up to a unique isomorphism. This expression makes sense in any category with an appropriate replacement for the tensor product of vector spaces. For any monoidal category (C, ⊗) one may attempt to define a dual of an object V to be an object V∗ ∈ C with a natural isomorphism of bifunctors
HomC((–)1 ⊗ V, (–)2) → HomC((–)1, V∗ ⊗ (–)2)
For a well-behaved notion of duality, this map should be not only natural in the sense of category theory, but also respect the monoidal structure in some way. An actual definition of a dual object is thus more complicated.

In a closed monoidal category C, i.e. a monoidal category with an internal Hom functor, an alternative approach is to simulate the standard definition of a dual vector space as a space of functionals. For an object V ∈ C define V∗ to be , where 1C is the monoidal identity. In some cases, this object will be a dual object to V in a sense above, but in general it leads to a different theory.

Definition

Consider an object  in a monoidal category . The object  is called a left dual of  if there exist two morphisms
such that the following two diagrams commute:

Left duals are canonically isomorphic when they exist, as are right duals.  When C is braided (or symmetric), every left dual is also a right dual, and vice versa. 

If we consider a monoidal category as a bicategory with one object, a dual pair is exactly an adjoint pair.

Examples
 Consider a monoidal category (VectK, ⊗K) of vector spaces over a field K with the standard tensor product. A space V is dualizable if and only if it is finite-dimensional, and in this case the dual object V∗ coincides with the standard notion of a dual vector space.
 Consider a monoidal category (ModR, ⊗R) of modules over a commutative ring R with the standard tensor product. A module M is dualizable if and only if it is a finitely generated projective module. In that case the dual object M∗ is also given by the module of homomorphisms HomR(M, R).
 Consider a homotopy category of pointed spectra Ho(Sp) with the smash product as the monoidal structure. This is a consequence of Spanier–Whitehead duality, which implies in particular Poincaré duality for compact manifolds.
 The category  of endofunctors of a category  is a monoidal category under composition of functors.

Categories with duals 

A monoidal category where every object has a left (respectively right) dual is sometimes called a left (respectively  right) autonomous category.  Algebraic geometers call it a left (respectively  right) rigid category.  A monoidal category where every object has both a left and a right dual is called an autonomous category.  An autonomous category that is also symmetric is called a compact closed category.

Traces
Any endomorphism f of a dualizable object admits a trace, which is a certain endomorphism of the monoidal unit of C. This notion includes, as very special cases, the trace in linear algebra and the Euler characteristic of a chain complex.

See also
 Dualizing object

References 

 
 
 

Monoidal categories